The following is a list of chronological attacks attributed to the Liberation Tigers of Tamil Eelam (LTTE), commonly known as the Tamil Tigers. The attacks include massacres, bombings, robberies, ethnic cleansing, military battles and assassinations of civilian and military targets. The LTTE is a separatist militant group that fought for a separate Tamil state in the north and east of Sri Lanka between 1976 and 2009. The rebel group has been banned by 33 countries, including the United States, United Kingdom, Canada, India, Malaysia, Sri Lanka and the 27 member nations of the European Union.

In opposition to this list, there is also the List of attacks on civilians attributed to Sri Lankan government forces.

Notable and deadliest attacks

Notes 

 *.This is not the complete list, refer to the attacks by decades for a complete list of attacks

Attacks by decade
Below are the deadliest attacks from each decade.

1970s

1979

1980s

1985

1990s

1990

2000s

2006

Attacks by type

Suicide bombings

Assassinations

See also
 List of attacks on civilians attributed to Sri Lankan government forces
 List of people assassinated by the Liberation Tigers of Tamil Eelam

References

Liberation Tigers of Tamil Eelam
Liberation Tigers of Tamil Eelam attacks in the Sri Lankan Civil War
LTTE
Massacres in Sri Lanka
Sri Lankan Civil War-related lists
War crimes in the Sri Lankan Civil War
Terrorist incidents by perpetrator